The Australian Cyber Security Centre (ACSC), the successor to the Cyber Security Operations Centre, is the Australian Government lead agency for cyber security. The ACSC is part of the Australian Signals Directorate and based at the Australian Security Intelligence Organisation headquarters in  Brindabella Business Park in Canberra. The Centre is overseen by the Cyber Security Operations Board, and is the joint responsibility of the Minister for Defence.

History
The Australian Cyber Security Centre was established in 2014, replacing the Cyber Security Operations Centre, also housed by the Australian Signals Directorate. In line with the recommendations of the 2017 Independent Review of the Australian Intelligence Community led by Michael L'Estrange and Stephen Merchant, Prime Minister Malcolm Turnbull announced that the role of the Australian Cyber Security Centre would be strengthened and that the Prime Minister's Special Adviser on Cyber Security, Alastair MacGibbon, would assume the responsibilities as the Head of the Centre within the Australian Signals Directorate, which was established as a statutory agency.

Role and responsibilities
The role of the Australian Cyber Security Centre is to:
lead the Australian Government’s operational response to cyber security incidents
organise national cyber security operations and resources
encourage and receive reporting of cyber attack and cyber security incidents
raise awareness of the level of cyber threats to Australia
study and investigate cyber threats

The ACSC integrates the national security cyber capabilities across the Australian Signals Directorate cyber security mission, cyber security experts from the Digital Transformation Agency, the Defence Intelligence Organisation strategic intelligence analysts, the Computer Emergency Response Team, the Cyber Security Policy Division of the Department of Home Affairs, Australian Security Intelligence Organisation cyber and telecommunications specialists, Australian Federal Police cyber crime investigators, and Australian Criminal Intelligence Commission cyber crime threat intelligence specialists. The Centre is also a hub for collaboration and information sharing with the private sector and critical infrastructure providers, state and territory governments, academia and international partners.

Governance
The Head of the Australian Cyber Security Centre is a concurrent Deputy Director-General of the Australian Signals Directorate. The Special Adviser to the Prime Minister on Cyber Security within the Department of the Prime Minister and Cabinet previously served concurrently as the Head of the Centre. The Special Adviser then became the National Cyber Coordinator within the Department of Home Affairs.

See also

Australian Cyber Collaboration Centre
Australian Intelligence Community
ECHELON
National Cyber Security Centre (disambiguation)

References

External links
 Australian Cyber Security Centre official website

Cryptography organizations
Signals intelligence agencies
Australian intelligence agencies
Commonwealth Government agencies of Australia
Defence Strategic Policy and Intelligence Group
Organisations based in Canberra
2014 establishments in Australia
Computer security organizations